Föroya Bjór is a Faroese brewing company based in Klaksvík. Apart from beers the company also produces soft drinks. It was established in 1888 in Klaksvík.

History
In 1883 Símun F. Hansen went to Denmark to learn the art of brewing and baking. Upon his return in the Faroe Islands in 1888, he established his own brewery in Klaksvík, the second to be established in the country. The first brewery was Restorffs Bryggjarí.

In 2009 Föroya Bjór opened an office in Reykjanesbær and started exporting its products in Iceland.

Name and symbol

The name of the brewery means The Beer of the Faroes. The ram is the symbol of Föroya Bjór since its establishment.

Product line 
 Veðrur - 4,6% A pilsner with a combination of malt and hops.
 Gold Export Lager - 5,8% A fruity flavour, balanced with a combination of malt and hop flavour.
 Jólabryggj - 5,8%
 Páskabryggj - 5,8%
 Ljóst Pilsnar - 2,7.%
 Maltöl - (malt beer) is under 2% abv, and quite malty and sweet.
 Jólaöl - (literally Christmas beer) is a dark, sweet maltöl (white beer) which is sold around Christmas time.
 Sluppöl - 5,8% An amber-coloured beer with malt, caramel and first-class hops taste (1984).
 Black Sheep - 5,8% A dark all-malt lager. Caramel, hops and roasted malt flavours (2001).
 Classic - 4,6% A dark pilsner with malt- and caramel flavour, balanced with first-class hops (2002).
 Rockall Brown Ale - 5,8%. Brewed with the English variety East Kent Golding of Noble hops (2006).
 Rockall Wheat Beer (2006)
 X-mas 1888 - 5,8% (2007)
 Green Islands Stout - 5,8% A dark beer with a sweet and bitter aroma. Brewed with a touch of coffee, liquorice and chocolate notes (2008).
 Green Islands Special - 5,8% (2008)
 Sct. Brigid Ale - 4,6% An amber-coloured ale brewed with a selection malts and hops (2008).
 Sct. Brigid Abbey Ale - 5,8% Abbey ale / Belgian dubbel
 Sct. Brigid Boheme (2008)
 Sct. Brigid Blond (2008)
 Sct. Brigid IPA (2008)

Gallery

See also

 Economy of the Faroe Islands
 List of companies of the Faroe Islands

References

External links

Föroya Bjór website

Breweries of the Faroe Islands
Danish companies established in 1888